Lemke's Widow is a 1957 West German comedy film directed by Helmut Weiss and starring Grethe Weiser, Brigitte Grothum, and Michael Heltau. It is a remake of the 1928 film of the same title. It was shot at the Wandsbek Studios in Hamburg and on location in the city. The film's sets were designed by the art director Erich Kettelhut.

Cast

References

Bibliography

External links 
 

1957 films
1957 comedy films
German comedy films
West German films
1950s German-language films
Films directed by Helmut Weiss
Remakes of German films
1950s German films
Films shot at Wandsbek Studios
Films shot in Hamburg
Films set in Hamburg